The Old Bunnell State Bank Building (also known as the Citizens Bank of Bunnell) is a historic site in Bunnell, Florida, located between 101 through 107 North Bay Street. On June 25, 1992, it was added to the U.S. National Register of Historic Places.

The Bunnell State Bank was incorporated in 1910 and moved into this building in 1917. The two-story structure is built in the Masonry Vernacular style, with decorative brickwork on the north side. The  interior is paneled with wood. This was the only bank in Flagler County from 1917 until 1932, and again from 1938 to 1942.

References

External links
 Flagler County listings at National Register of Historic Places
 Flagler County listings at Florida's Office of Cultural and Historical Programs

Buildings and structures in Flagler County, Florida
Bank buildings on the National Register of Historic Places in Florida
National Register of Historic Places in Flagler County, Florida